Slatinice is a municipality and village in Olomouc District in the Olomouc Region of the Czech Republic. It has about 1,600 inhabitants.

Administrative parts
The village of Lípy is an administrative part of Slatinice.

Notable people
Jan Fiala (born 1956), footballer

References

Villages in Olomouc District
Spa towns in the Czech Republic